Kasuga no Iratsume (? – fl. 507) was Empress of Japan as the consort of Emperor Buretsu.

Only Empress Consort with unknown parents.

Notes

Japanese empresses
Year of death missing
5th-century Japanese women
6th-century Japanese women